George C. Papanicolaou (born January 23, 1943) is a Greek-American mathematician who specializes in applied and computational mathematics, partial differential equations, and stochastic processes. He is currently the Robert Grimmett Professor in Mathematics at Stanford University.

Biography
Papanicolaou was born on January 23, 1943, in Athens, Greece. He received his B.E.E. from Union College and his M.S. and Ph.D. from New York University (NYU) in 1969. His PhD thesis, performed under the supervision of Joseph Bishop Keller was entitled "On Stochastic Differential Equations and Applications". At NYU, he started out as an assistant professor in 1969 before moving up to associate professor in 1973 and finally professor in 1976. Later, in 1993, he relocated to Stanford.

He has had 42 doctoral students and 220 descendants. He is married, with three children.

Publications
Papanicolaou has more than 250 publications  on a wide range of topics, including imaging, communications and time reversal, waves in random media, convection-diffusion, nonlinear waves, high contrast materials, mathematical finance, and homogenization.

Recognition
George Papanicolaou is a member of the National Academy of Sciences, and he is a Fellow of the American Academy of Arts and Sciences, the American Mathematical Society (AMS), and the Society for Industrial and Applied Mathematics (SIAM). He was a plenary speaker at the International Congress of Mathematicians in 1998 and the International Congress of Industrial and Applied Mathematics (ICIAM) in 2003. He was awarded a Sloan Research Fellowship (1974), a Guggenheim Fellowship (1983), the von Neumann Lectureship from SIAM (2006), the William Benter Prize in Applied Mathematics (2010), the Gibbs Lectureship of the AMS (2011), and the Lagrange Prize from ICIAM (2019). He received an Honorary Doctor of Science, University of Athens in 1987 and a Doctor Honoris Causa, University of Paris VII in 2011.

Books 
 "Asymptotic Analysis for Periodic Structures", Alain Bensoussan, Jacques-Louis Lions and George Papanicolaou, North Holland (1978), Reprinted by the American Mathematical Society (2011).
 "Derivatives in Financial Markets with Stochastic Volatility", Jean-Pierre Fouque, George Papanicolaou and K. Ronnie Sircar, Cambridge University Press (2000).
"Wave Propagation and Time Reversal in Randomly Layered Media", Jean-Pierre Fouque, Josselin Garnier, George Papanicolaou and Knut Solna, Springer (2007).
"Multiscale Stochastic Volatility for Equity, Interest-Rate and Credit Derivatives", Jean-Pierre Fouque, George Papanicolaou , K. Ronnie Sircar and Knut Solna, Cambridge University Press (2011).
 "Passive Imaging with Ambient Noise", Josselin Garnier and George Papanicolaou, Cambridge University Press (2016).

Notes

External links
 Website
 

1943 births
Living people
Fellows of the Society for Industrial and Applied Mathematics
Sloan Research Fellows
Stanford University Department of Mathematics faculty
Courant Institute of Mathematical Sciences alumni
PDE theorists
Members of the United States National Academy of Sciences
Fellows of the American Mathematical Society
New York University faculty